The 2019 Cassis Open Provence was a professional tennis tournament played on hard courts. It was the 2nd edition of the tournament which was part of the 2019 ATP Challenger Tour. It took place in Cassis, France between 2 and 8 September 2019.

Singles main-draw entrants

Seeds

 1 Rankings are as of 26 August 2019.

Other entrants
The following players received wildcards into the singles main draw:
  Vivien Cabos
  Ilya Ivashka
  Corentin Moutet
  Rayane Roumane
  Jo-Wilfried Tsonga

The following player received entry into the singles main draw using a protected ranking:
  Maximilian Neuchrist

The following players received entry into the singles main draw as alternates:
  Harri Heliövaara
  Luca Margaroli
  Jaume Pla Malfeito
  Yoav Schab
  Sem Verbeek

Champions

Singles

 Jo-Wilfried Tsonga def.  Dudi Sela 6–1, 6–0.

Doubles

 André Göransson /  Sem Verbeek def.  Sander Arends /  David Pel 7–6(8–6), 4–6, [11–9].

References

2019 ATP Challenger Tour
2019 in French sport
September 2019 sports events in France